Carol Mokola (born 1 January 1977) is a Zambian sprinter. She competed in the women's 100 metres at the 2004 Summer Olympics.

References

1977 births
Living people
Athletes (track and field) at the 2004 Summer Olympics
Zambian female sprinters
Olympic athletes of Zambia
Place of birth missing (living people)
Olympic female sprinters